Mont Fourchon is a mountain of the Pennine Alps, located on the border between Switzerland and Italy. It is located on the main chain of the Alps, approximately halfway between the Grand Golliat and the Great St Bernard Pass.

References

External links
 Mont Fourchon on Hikr

Mountains of the Alps
Mountains of Valais
Mountains of Aosta Valley
Italy–Switzerland border
International mountains of Europe
Mountains of Switzerland
Two-thousanders of Switzerland